Kovrizhka is a rural locality (a selo) and the administrative center of Kovrizhsky Selsoviet of Konstantinovsky District, Amur Oblast, Russia. The population was 378 as of 2018. There are 7 streets.

Geography 
Kovrizhka is located 20 km northwest of Konstantinovka (the district's administrative centre) by road. Oktyabrskoye is the nearest rural locality.

References 

Rural localities in Konstantinovsky District